The Democratic Party primary for the 2021 New York City mayoral election took place on June 22, 2021. Brooklyn Borough President Eric Adams defeated 12 other candidates, including Kathryn Garcia, Maya Wiley and Andrew Yang. Adams went on to defeat Republican Curtis Sliwa and other candidates in the November 2, 2021 general election.

Background
In 2019, New York City voters passed Ballot Question #1 to amend the City Charter to "give voters the choice of ranking up to five candidates in primary and special elections for mayor, public advocate, comptroller, borough president, and city council beginning in January 2021". The first election in the city to use ranked-choice voting was in the 24th council district in Queens, which took place on February 2, 2021, though the first ranked-choice election with multiple rounds was held in the 31st council district in Queens on February 23. The 2021 mayoral primaries were the first New York City mayoral election primaries to use ranked-choice voting.

In 2019, journalists and political commentators predicted several potential candidates, including Brooklyn Borough President Eric Adams, Bronx Borough President Rubén Díaz Jr., NYC Council Speaker Corey Johnson, NYC Comptroller Scott Stringer, and NYC Public Advocate Jumaane Williams. All of the preceding candidates ended up joining the mayoral race with the exception of Williams, who instead decided to run for re-election as Public Advocate. Additionally, Díaz Jr. and Johnson dropped out before the primary election, with Johnson instead deciding to run for Comptroller.

Candidates

Major candidates 
The following candidates (listed alphabetically) appear on the Democratic primary ballot and have held office, have been included in polls, or have been the subject of significant media coverage.

Other candidates qualifying for the ballot 
Art Chang, former JPMorgan Chase managing director, founder of NYC Votes
Aaron Foldenauer, attorney
Paperboy Love Prince, Brooklyn rapper
Joycelyn Taylor, CEO of TaylorMade Contracting
Isaac Wright Jr., lawyer

Write-in candidates who did not qualify for ballot access 
 Eddie Cullen, tech entrepreneur and professor at Purdue University
Ävatar Daví, tech entrepreneur and artist
Thomas Downs, restaurant worker
Guiddalia Emilien, real estate agent and small business owner
Garry Guerrier, paramedic and nurse
Max Kaplan, director of social media at Talent Resources
Barbara Kavovit, CEO of Evergreen Construction and former Real Housewives of New York City cast member
Ira Seidman, data scientist
Ahsan Syed, candidate for NYC Mayor in 2017

Withdrawn candidates 
Michael DeName, former independent US presidential candidate
Rubén Díaz Jr., Bronx Borough President (2009present), former NY State Assemblymember (19972009) (endorsed Eric Adams)
Quanda S. Francis, president of Sykes Capital Management (withdrew to run as an independent)
Zach Iscol, entrepreneur, United States Marine Corps veteran (running for NYC Comptroller; lost election)
Corey Johnson, Speaker of the NYC Council (2018present), NYC Councilmember for the 3rd district (2014present) (running for NYC Comptroller)
Carlos Menchaca, NYC Councilmember for Brooklyn's 38th district (2013–present) (endorsed Andrew Yang)
Julia Qing Reaves, LGBT+ activist
Stephen Bishop Seely, actor
Loree Sutton, former Commissioner of the NYC Department of Veterans' Services (20172019), former US Army brigadier general (endorsed Kathryn Garcia)

Declined 
Andy Byford, former president of the NYC Transit Authority (20182020)
Melinda Katz, Queens County District Attorney (2020present), Queens Borough President (20142020), NYC Councilmember for the 29th district (20022009), NY State Assemblymember for the 28th district (19941999)
Melissa Mark-Viverito, former NYC Council Speaker (20142017)
Alexandria Ocasio-Cortez, US Representative for New York's 14th congressional district (2019present) (endorsed Maya Wiley)
Christine Quinn, former NYC Council Speaker (20062013)
Max Rose, former US Representative for New York's 11th congressional district (20192021) (formed exploratory committee but did not run)
Ritchie Torres, US Representative for New York's 15th congressional district (2021present) (endorsed Andrew Yang)
Jumaane Williams, NYC Public Advocate (2019present), former NYC Councilmember for the 45th district (20102019) (running for re-election as NYC Public Advocate) (endorsed Maya Wiley)
Jeff Zucker, chairman of Warner Media News & Sports (2019present)

Campaign

Early months
Polling in late January and early February showed businessman Andrew Yang as the frontrunner, with Adams in second and Stringer in third place. As of January 20, 2021, of the major declared candidates, New York City councilmember Carlos Menchaca and former Commissioner of the NYC Dept. of Veterans' Services Loree Sutton were considered the weakest candidates and most likely to drop out, as both of them posted very poor fundraising numbers. Sutton withdrew from the race on March 10, 2021 and Menchaca withdrew on March 24, 2021. By the middle of March, three candidates, Stringer, Dianne Morales, and Maya Wiley, were widely considered to be the chief competitors for the progressive vote.

Stringer sexual assault allegations
In April, Stringer, who was generally polling in third-place, was accused of sexual abuse by Jean Kim, who claimed that Stringer had forcibly kissed and groped her when she worked on his 2001 campaign for Public Advocate. Fellow candidates Morales, Adams, Yang, and Raymond McGuire condemned the acts in the allegation; while candidates Wiley, Kathryn Garcia, and Shaun Donovan called for him to drop out. Stringer denied the allegations, claiming that the relationship had been consensual. In June, a second woman accused him of sexual misconduct in 1992.

Debates 
The first debate in the Democratic primary was sponsored by the Brooklyn Democratic Party and held on January 31, 2021. Eight candidates participated: Adams, former director of the US Office of Management and Budget Shaun Donovan, former commissioner of the NYC Dept. of Sanitation Kathryn Garcia, businessman Raymond McGuire, Stringer, Sutton, former counsel to Bill de Blasio Maya Wiley, and Yang. Former non-profit CEO Dianne Morales boycotted the debate following comments perceived as sinophobic by a former Brooklyn Democratic Party official.

The second debate took place on May 13, 2021. It was organized by the New York City Campaign Finance Board (CFB) and sponsored by NY1. Eight candidates met the CFB's qualifications to participate in the debate. Those who participated were Adams, Donovan, Garcia, McGuire, Morales, Stringer, Wiley, and Yang.

The third debate was held on June 2, 2021. It was organized by the CFB and sponsored by ABC 7. Eight candidates met the CFB's qualifications to participate in the debate. Those who participated were Adams, Donovan, Garcia, McGuire, Morales, Stringer, Wiley, and Yang.

The fourth debate was held on June 10, 2021, and sponsored by CBS 2. Five candidates participated: Adams, Garcia, Stringer, Wiley, and Yang. Adams initially announced that he would skip the debate but later opted to attend.

The fifth and final debate of the Democratic primary took place on June 16, 2021. It was organized by the CFB and was sponsored by NBC 4. Eight candidates met the CFB's qualifications and were required to participate: Adams, Donovan, Garcia, McGuire, Morales, Stringer, Wiley, and Yang.

Closing weeks
On May 5, 2021, Politico reported that a recent poll found that Eric Adams was leading the Democratic primary contest; this marked the first time since January that any Democratic candidate other than Yang had led in a public poll. On June 7, Spectrum News reported that Adams had maintained a lead in the Democratic primary.

In early May, Donovan and McGuire were characterized as being out of touch with everyday New Yorkers for greatly underestimating the median cost of a home in Brooklyn. In late May, Yang, who lives in Hell's Kitchen, faced some ridicule for answering that Times Square was his favorite subway station; the response was seen as akin to that of a tourist. Later in May, Morales's campaign lost three senior staff members amid allegations of a poor workplace culture and union-busting. Morales's campaign lost some endorsements and support.

In June, due to ongoing rumors that he lived in New Jersey, Eric Adams invited reporters to Bedford-Stuyvesant to tour an apartment that he claimed was his residence.
 
Four days before the end of the balloting period, Garcia and Yang campaigned together. Yang asked his supporters to rank Garcia second, though she did not make a similar request of hers. Adams claimed the alliance was an attempt to disenfranchise Black and Latino voters, a claim that Garcia and Yang disputed, with rivals and officials such as Wiley and Williams claiming that Adams was using race in order to undermine confidence in the election.

Endorsements

Opinion polling

Results
On June 29, the New York City Board of Elections became aware of a discrepancy in the unofficial primary results and subsequently posted in a tweet that both test and election night results were tallied together in an error, adding approximately 135,000 additional votes.

On July 6, after new vote tallies were released, the Associated Press declared Eric Adams to be the winner of the primary. The Guardian stated that Adams had prevailed "after appealing to the political center and promising to strike the right balance between fighting crime and ending racial injustice in policing". An earlier report from The New York Times asserted that Adams had run as a "working-class underdog" and had "hammered away at the message that he was the only candidate who could tackle both crime and police reform". The Associated Press later added that Adams had made "his rejection of left-leaning activists’ calls to defund the police" a "centerpiece of his campaign".

Adams was heavily favored to prevail in the general election.

References

2021 Democratic primary
New York City Democratic primary
New York City mayoral
Democratic mayoral primary
June 2021 events in the United States
Democratic Party (United States) events
New York City
Eric Adams